Dyami Brown (born November 1, 1999) is an American football wide receiver for the Washington Commanders of the National Football League (NFL). He played college football at North Carolina, where he recorded consecutive 1,000 yard seasons in 2019 and 2020 before being drafted by Washington in the third round of the 2021 NFL Draft.

Early life and high school
Brown grew up in Charlotte, North Carolina, and attended West Mecklenburg High School. As a junior, Brown had 999 receiving yards and 14 touchdowns with five interceptions on defense. He caught 41 passes for 631 yards and 10 touchdowns and also rushed for five touchdowns in his senior year. A four-star recruit, Brown was considered the best wide receiver prospect of his class in the state and committed to play college football for the 
Tar Heels at the University of North Carolina.

College career
As a freshman, Brown caught 17 passes for 173 yards and a touchdown. As a sophomore, he had 51 receptions for 1,034 yards, leading the Atlantic Coast Conference (ACC) with 20.3 yards per reception, and tied the school record with 12 touchdowns. He was named ACC Receiver of the Week after catching six passes for 202 yards and three touchdowns in a loss to the Virginia Cavaliers. He was named receiver of the week again after a six reception, 150-yard performance against NC State.

Brown followed up in 2020 by having another 1,000 yard season with eight touchdowns and was named third-team All-American by the Associated Press in the process. He was also the first FBS player since 2000 to average at least 20 yards per catch in consecutive years. He opted out of participating in the 2021 Orange Bowl in order to prepare for the 2021 NFL Draft. His younger brother Khafre played wide receiver alongside him at North Carolina.

Professional career

Brown was selected by the Washington Football Team in the third round (82nd overall) of the 2021 NFL Draft. He signed his four-year rookie contract on May 13, 2021.

2021 season: Rookie year

Heading into his first training camp in the NFL, Brown was slated to be a starting wide receiver alongside Terry McLaurin and Curtis Samuel.  However, he still faced competition from Adam Humphries, DeAndre Carter, and Cam Sims for his job.  At the end of the NFL preseason, head coach Ron Rivera named Brown a starting wide receiver alongside McLaurin and Humphries after Samuel was placed on injured reserve.

Brown made his first career start and NFL debut in the Washington Football Team's Week 1 loss to the Los Angeles Chargers.  He played in 93% of the team's offensive snaps that game, recording 1 reception for -2 yards on 4 targets.  The following week against the New York Giants, Brown recorded 3 receptions for 34 yards on 87% of the offensive snaps.  The Washington Football Team won that game 30-29.  In Week 3 against the Buffalo Bills, Brown was targeted twice but did not record a reception.  After this game, Brown was in and out of the starting lineup as he split snaps on offense with Curtis Samuel, who had returned from injured reserve.  In Week 16 against the Dallas Cowboys, Brown recorded 2 receptions for 53 yards as the Washington Football Team lost 56-14.

Overall, Brown finished his rookie season appearing in 15 games (6 starts) and recorded 12 receptions for 165 yards and no touchdowns while appearing in 34% of his team's offensive snaps on the season.

2022 season
In Week 5 of the 2022 season against the Tennessee Titans, Brown caught two passes for 105 yards with both being touchdown receptions, as well as, his career first touchdowns.

Career statistics

References

External links

Washington Commanders bio
North Carolina Tar Heels bio

Living people
1999 births
Players of American football from Charlotte, North Carolina
American football wide receivers
North Carolina Tar Heels football players
Washington Commanders players
Washington Football Team players
African-American players of American football
21st-century African-American sportspeople